Eternal Father may refer to:
Eternal Father, synonym of God the Father
Eternal Father, Strong to Save, hymn